The Metro A Line is a bus rapid transit line in the Twin Cities, Minnesota operated by Metro Transit. The A Line operates primarily along the Snelling Avenue corridor and travels through the cities of Minneapolis, Saint Paul, Falcon Heights, and Roseville. From the Blue Line in Minneapolis, the line travels past Minnehaha Park, through the Highland Village commercial area, past Macalester College, and connects to the Green Line near Allianz Field. The line continues through Saint Paul, past Hamline University, before traveling through Falcon Heights and Roseville, where the line passes the Minnesota State Fairgrounds, Har Mar Mall, and terminates at Rosedale Center.

While lacking dedicated bus lanes typically associated with bus rapid transit, there are many features that improve the speed and reliability of the line. Buses have wider doors and allow entry at all doors because fares are collected in advance at machines located at stations. Station shelters also have light, heat, and real-time arrival signs. Many intersections along the line have transit signal preemption, which in combination with all of the other features of the line, improved travel times in the corridor by 25%.

Transit has operated in the corridor since 1905 when streetcars began operating until they were replaced by buses in 1952. In the mid-2000s the Met Council began making plans for upgraded urban core local bus routes, which it called arterial bus rapid transit. A study completed in 2012 found the A Line corridor to be the best suited in the region for the first project and after delays and construction setbacks, the line opened in 2016 at a cost of $27 million. Ridership in the corridor has increased roughly 33% since opening. In 2018 the A Line carried an average of 4,860 passengers per weekday, and by 2030, the A Line is expected to carry 8,000 passengers per day.

Route description
The A Line's southern terminus is at the 46th Street station of the Metro Blue Line. At the station are connections to four Metro Transit routes and two Minnesota Valley Transit Authority routes. A Line buses travel east along 46th St, cross Minnesota State Highway 55, also known as Hiawatha Avenue, before passing near Minnehaha Park. East 46th St becomes Ford Parkway and crosses the Mississippi River on the Intercity Bridge which is just north of the Mississippi River's Lock and Dam No. 1. The line enters the city of Saint Paul on the bridge, and then passes by the former Twin Cities Assembly Plant which in 2020 was being redeveloped into housing and commercial properties. Ford Parkway continues through the Highland Village commercial node in Highland Park, Saint Paul where there are connections to seven Metro Transit bus routes, until reaching Snelling Avenue next to the Highland Park Tower. After turning north on Snelling, the passes Macalester College in the Macalester-Groveland neighborhood before crossing Grand Avenue and Summit Avenue. While traveling through the Merriam Park neighborhood of Saint Paul the line passes a future connection to the Metro B Line near Selby Avenue. After crossing Interstate 94, the line passes Allianz Field and the Midway shopping area in the Hamline Midway neighborhood. A connection to the Green Line at the Snelling Avenue station along University Avenue is available. The line continues north past Hamline University, the Minnesota State Fairgrounds, and the Como Park neighborhood of Saint Paul. The line enters Falcon Heights, Minnesota and passes Larpenteur Avenue before passing by the Har Mar Mall in Roseville, Minnesota. The line crosses Minnesota State Highway 36 before terminating at Rosedale Center where there are connections to eight Metro Transit bus routes.

Service

The A Line runs every 10 minutes during daytime service on weekdays and weekends, with reduced frequencies of up to 30 minutes in the early morning and late evening. Route 84, which previously served the Snelling Avenue corridor, was retained with 30-minute service to provide connections from the corridor to other areas. When the Green Line opened in 2014, just the Snelling Avenue portion of the route had 10-minute service. After the opening of the A Line, the entire corridor had 10-minute service which was part of an increase of 63,300 to 80,900 annual service hours. Estimated annual operating costs are $4.2 million.

Ridership in the corridor, which combines the A Line and Route 84, rose from 3,800 weekday rides to 5,100 weekday rides over the same time period in the first month after opening. In the overall first year of operation, ridership in the corridor increased by 30%. The A Line served almost 1.7 million rides in 2019 which was a 3 percent increase from the year before.

Features
The A Line employs several bus rapid transit features that result in service that is six to eight minutes faster than existing buses on Snelling Avenue. Transit signal priority is installed at 19 of the 34 traffic signals on the line, which has improved reliability on the line. The corridor lacks bus lanes which are typical for many bus rapid transit lines. Metro Transit did not consider bus lanes in their project proposal to be reasonable and maintains that dedicated bus lanes would not have sped up travel times significantly due to most speed improvement being linked to other A Line design features that minimized red light and passenger delay. By January 2018, A Line buses had improved their on-time performance to 94% compared to prior to opening when buses had 90.7% on-time performance and spent around 24% of their time waiting at traffic signals. Stations are spaced at roughly  intervals which helps limit the time spent on accelerating and stopping the bus. Previous buses in the corridor stopped at up to 80 stops, while the A Line travels further between stops and has only 20 stations located at high-traffic areas.

Stations on the A Line have enhanced features to differentiate them from local bus stops. Station shelters follow a "kit-of-parts" design so they can be easily identified and used throughout Metro's bus rapid transit system. There are three different station sizes–small, medium, and large–and the size chosen depends on daily boardings and site context. Stations have lighted canopies, on-demand heating, security cameras and emergency telephones, benches, and bike parking. Pavement in boarding areas are treated with a darker shade of concrete to delineate them from the sidewalk. Ticket vending machines and Go-To card readers are located on platforms for off-board fare collection, speeding up the boarding process and reducing bus dwell time. Each station has a pylon marker that provides real-time bus arrival information and station identification. Illuminated signage at the top of the station blinks when a bus arriving. Curbs at stations have tactile warning strips and are raised  from the road surface, facilitating near-level boarding to speed up and make boarding easier. To increase travel speed and reduce delay related to pulling in and out of traffic while stopping, stations are located far-side of intersections and curbs are extended out to the travel lane where buses stop to board passengers.

Buses on the A Line have wider rear doors which in combination with all-door boarding, allows for reduced dwell time when passengers are boarding or alighting. There is no fare collection equipment on board due to off-board fare payment machines located at stations. 12 new buses were purchased for the line at a cost of $500,000 each, which is roughly 10% greater than a normal bus. Buses used on the A Line have more standing room than other Metro Transit buses, stainless steel seat frames, and provide free on-board Wi-Fi. Buses have a unique exterior paint scheme from other Metro Transit vehicles, rounded exterior molding edges, and brighter digital displays. The internal digital displays are able to show real-time service information on connecting routes, announcements, and what stops are upcoming. Initially 12 buses were purchased for the line with 3 being new buses and 9 being replacement buses from an existing contract with Gillig. An additional bus was purchased a month after the line opened to improve maintenance and reliability operations.

The passenger experience and legibility of the line helped it be described as "probably the best bus route in the US" by one transit expert. Riders are more satisfied with the A Line's service than regular route local bus service. Six police officers were added to the Metro Transit Police Department to monitor buses and check tickets on the A Line.

Stations

History
Streetcars ran along Snelling Avenue from 1905 until 1952. The line was an important crosstown connection to many other streetcar lines. The Snelling streetcar line did not travel north of Larpenteur Avenue and instead traveled closer to Como Park along Como Ave, Pascal Ave, Arlington Ave, and Hamline Ave. In 1947 a shuttle bus began to run from Snelling and Como Avenues, north past Larpenteur Avenue to Roselawn Avenue in Roseville. The bus service was extended and connected with the replacement bus service along Snelling Avenue that was instituted in 1952 when streetcars no longer ran the route. At its peak, the Twin City Rapid Transit Company ran 10-minute peak, and 15-minute offpeak service on the corridor. The Snelling Streetcar Shops and then later Snelling Bus Garage, both located at the intersection of Snelling and University Avenues, served many transit routes in the area including service along Snelling Avenue. Portions of the Snelling Streetcar Shops were turned into a shopping center and the Snelling Bus Barn was torn down in 2001. Allianz Field was later constructed on portions of the former bus barn.

Return of streetcars to the corridor has been studied. In 2001, a neighborhood plan for Macalester Groveland encouraged study of a streetcar along Snelling. The City of Saint Paul along with consultants conducted a $250,000 study of creating streetcar network for the city in 2012–2014. Snelling Avenue as a corridor by itself was one of the five best transit corridors for streetcars, partially due to the transit supportive land use. Pairing a Snelling Avenue streetcar with a route along Ford Parkway was also suggested as a possibility. A streetcar line along the length of Snelling Avenue was not proposed on the long-term network but a portion of Snelling between Hamline University to Selby Avenue was selected as a potential corridor. A Snelling + Ford Parkway streetcar corridor from 46th Street Station to the Green Line and a Snelling North corridor from the Green Line to Como Park scored lower on the study's screening criteria due to lower ridership, less transit supportive land use, and limited potential to redevelop properties. The Snelling + Selby Corridor was not selected as an initial starter line.

Bus service along the corridor in 2010 was provided by Routes 84 and 144. Route 84 ran 15-minute weekday and Saturday service from Rosedale Center before diverging into several branches close to Ford Parkway. Service was only every 30-minutes on Sundays. Route 144 ran along Snelling Avenue from around Ford Parkway until it reached Interstate 94 where it traveled west, exited and served the University of Minnesota, before finishing in downtown Minneapolis. Service was only offered during peak periods at 15–30 minutes frequencies. As part of the Green Line opening in 2014, service for the Route 84 increased to 10-minutes 7 days a week and two branches were combined into one branch. Service to 46th St Station was only every 30-minutes but the A Line was in planning stages to provide 10-minute service along the corridor with a goal opening of 2014. Route 144 was eliminated because it only served 144 rides a day and alternative service was available as a transfer between Route 84 and the Green Line. Travel time was only planned to increase by 6 minutes to the U of M and by 2 minutes to downtown Minneapolis.

The Metropolitan Council, the metropolitan planning organization for the Twin Cities, completed a 2030 Transit Master Study for the region in 2008 which identified arterial bus network corridors and encouraged further study of arterial bus rapid transit projects. The council set the goal of doubling transit ridership by 2030 in their 2030 Transportation Policy Plan and identified implementing arterial bus rapid transit as a method of increasing ridership. Metro Transit began study of 11 corridors for their potential for arterial bus rapid transit in 2011–2012. Those 11 routes served 90,000 riders per weekday, which was close to half of the total ridership for urban routes. Ridership on implemented routes was predicted to increase 20 to 30 percent after the first year of opening. Corridors were evaluated on capital and operating costs, potential ridership, and travel time savings. At the time, an opening for the first BRT line was hoped to open in 2014. By 2012 Snelling Avenue and West Seventh Street were identified as the first two candidates for implementation. Snelling Avenue showed promise for its connection to the Green and Blue lines. While no funding sources were identified, planners hoped to open the line in time for the Green Line opening in 2014.

The project was originally named the Snelling Avenue Bus Rapid Transitway until 2013 when the region's arterial bus rapid transit projects were branded with letters. As the first project, the corridor was named the A Line. The current route of the A Line was approved in 2014 by the Metropolitan Council as the region's first arterial bus rapid transit project. By then an opening date was aimed for late 2015 and further study of a northern extension was still ongoing. Neighborhood plans for the neighborhoods along the corridor encouraged transit accessibility improvements and other changes to support transit along Snelling Avenue. Funding for the project came from a variety of sources including $14.6 million of the costs from CMAQ, Metropolitan Council, and MnDOT Trunkhighway Bonds, as Snelling Avenue also serves as State Highway 51. Other funding came from the state legislature. After design reviews postponed the approval of a contract for station construction until June 2015, the opening date was pushed from late 2015 to 2016. Construction bids were 45% higher than estimated due to delayed bidding and unique project design. Final costs were $27 million compared to a 2012 estimate of $25 million. Metro Transit began testing operating A Line buses along the corridor by February 2016 before the planned June opening. The line officially opened June 11, 2016.

Future
Ramsey County and the St. Paul Area Chamber of Commerce requested the Metropolitan Council study an extension of the A Line before construction of the A Line had begun. The Council agreed to study the extension in November 2013. The extension studied had a northern terminus of the Twin Cities Army Ammunition Plant redevelopment in Arden Hills which is also known as the Rice Creek Commons. The extension would add 10 additional stops and would connect the University of Northwestern – St. Paul and Bethel University, as well as major employers, including Land O'Lakes, Inc. and Boston Scientific, to the broader public transportation system. In the final report issued in September 2016, Metro Transit concluded that there was no funding available and ridership did not support an immediate extension. The study encouraged the development of transit supportive land use and development patterns. The comprehensive plans for the cities of Roseville and Arden Hills both contain sections on an A Line extension and the need to keep BRT in mind when developing land within the corridor.

The B Line is proposed to share stations with the A Line at Snelling and Dayton Avenues.

See also
 Metro Transit 
 Metro Red Line
 Metro C Line

References

External links

Bus rapid transit in Minnesota
Transportation in Minneapolis
Transportation in Saint Paul, Minnesota
Transportation in Ramsey County, Minnesota
2016 establishments in Minnesota
Metro Transit (Minnesota)